is a Japanese singer-songwriter who plays guitar-driven blues, rock, and pop music, though he has also recorded piano ballads. Though he primarily plays the guitar, he has played the drums, piano, percussion, saxophone, and glockenspiel on some albums.

He released his second album in 1997, which contained his breakout and most famous single "One More Time, One More Chance." This song was used in Makoto Shinkai's anime film 5 Centimeters per Second.

In September 2002, he performed the Beatles song "All My Loving" for Sir Paul McCartney.

Discography

Singles
 Tsukiakari ni Terasarete (1995)
 Chuka Ryori (1996)
 Serori (1996)
 One more time, One more chance (1997)
 Adrenaline (1997)
 Furimukanai (1997)
 Mizu no Nai Suisou (1998)
 Boku ha Koko ni Iru (1998)
 Passage (1999)
 Yawarakai Tsuki (2000)
 Ashita no Kaze (2000)
 Plastic Soul (2001)
 Shinpakusu (2002)
 Zenbu Kimi datta (2003)
 Mikansei (2003)
 Boku to Furyo to Koutei de (2003)
 Bokura ha Shizuka ni Kieteiku (2004)
 Biidama Bouenkyou (2004)
 Menuetto (2005)
 8-gatsu no Christmas (2005)
 Angel-A (2006)
 One More Time, One More Chance (5 centimeters Per Second Special Edition) (2007)
 Mayonaka no Boon Boon (2008)
 Shinkaigyo (2008)
 Heart of Winter (2008)
 Haru mo Arashi mo (2009)
 Hobo Walking (2010)
 Hanabi (2010)
 Taiyo no Yakusoku (2012)
 Aphrodite (2012)
 Hoshizora Guitar (2012)
 Altair no Namida (2013)
 Kokoro No Tegami (2014)
 Nijuuisseiki Man (20th Anniversary Version) (2015)
 Sorae (2016)
 Kimono Namae (2016)
 Kaisou Densha (2019)
 Kagefumi (Movie Version) (2019)

Studio albums
 Allergy no tokkoyaku (Specific for allergy) (1996)
 Home (1997)
 domino (1998)
 Sheep (2000)
 transition (2001)
 Atelier (2003)
 Address (2006)
 In My House (2009)
 Hobo's Music (2010)
 Flowers (2013)
 Life (2016)
 Quarter Note (2019)

EP
 Celery (1996)
 Stereo (1996)
 Stereo 2 (1997)
 Furimukanai/Gamushara Butterfly (1997)
 Boku Wa Kokoniiru (1998)
 Passage (1999)
 Plastic Soul (2001)
 Shinpakusuu (Toukai Area/Live) (2002)
 Shinpakusuu (Touhoku Area/Live) (2002)
 Shinpakusuu (Shinetsu Hokuriku Area/Live) (2002)
 Shinpakusuu (Shikoku Area/Live) (2002)
 Shinpakusuu (Kyuushuu Okinawa/Live) (2002)
 Shinpakusuu (Kinki Area/Live) (2002)
 Shinpakusuu (Kantou Area/Live) (2002)
 Shinpakusuu (Hokkaidou/Live) (2002)
 Shinpakusuu (Shikoku Area/Live) (2002)
 Shinpakusuu (Chuugoku Area/Live) (2002)
 Mikansei (2003)
 Bokuto Furyouto Kouteide (2003)
 Bi-Dama Scope (2004)
 Angela (2006)
 Mayonakano Boon Boon (2008)
 Heart of Winter (2008)
 Harumo Arashimo (2009)
 Hobo Walking (2009)
 Hanabi (2010)
 Taiyou No Yakusoku (2012)
 Aphrodite (2012)
 Altair No Namida (2013)
 I'm Home (2018)

Live albums
 One Knight Stands (2000)
 Transit Time (2002)
 With Strings (collaborated with Takayuki Hattori and Rush Strings, 2006)
 Concert at Suntory Hall (2011)
 Harvest ~ Live Seed Folks Special in Katsushika 2014 ~ (2015)

Cover albums
 Cover All Yo! (2007)
 Cover All Ho! (2007)

Compilation albums
 Blue Period (A-Side single collection, 2005)
 Out of the Blue (B-Side single collection, 2005)
 The Road to Yamazaki ~ the Best for beginners ~ (2013)
 Rose Period – The Best 2005–2015 (2015)

Live DVD
 Domino Round (1999)
 One Knight Stands on Films (2000)
 Concert at Suntory Hall (2011)
 One Knight Stands 2010–2011 on Films (2011)

References

External links
 Official Site  — Official site by his management office, "Office Augusta"
 Artist Page in Universal Music Japan

Japanese male singer-songwriters
Japanese singer-songwriters
Japanese male pop singers
People from Yamaguchi Prefecture
1971 births
Living people
Musicians from Yamaguchi Prefecture
Musicians from Shiga Prefecture
21st-century Japanese singers
21st-century Japanese male singers